Çiyni or Chiyni may refer to:
Çiyni, Agsu, Azerbaijan
Çiyni (40° 27' N 47° 47' E), Ujar, Azerbaijan
Çiyni (40° 32' N 47° 35' E), Ujar, Azerbaijan
Çiyni, Kurşunlu